The following highways are/were numbered 926:

Costa Rica
 National Route 926

United States